Oldřich Svoboda (born 28 January 1967 in Hradec Králové) played goalie on the 1992 Bronze medal winning Olympic ice hockey team for Czechoslovakia.

External links

1967 births
Czech ice hockey goaltenders
Czechoslovak ice hockey goaltenders
Essen Mosquitoes players
HC Dukla Jihlava players
HC TPS players
Ice hockey players at the 1992 Winter Olympics
Living people
Medalists at the 1992 Winter Olympics
Motor České Budějovice players
Olympic bronze medalists for Czechoslovakia
Olympic ice hockey players of Czechoslovakia
Olympic medalists in ice hockey
Orli Znojmo players
Sportspeople from Hradec Králové
Stadion Hradec Králové players
Czechoslovak expatriate sportspeople in Finland
Czechoslovak expatriate ice hockey people
Czech expatriate ice hockey players in Finland
Czech expatriate ice hockey players in Russia
Czech expatriate ice hockey players in Germany